Evgenija Ivanovna Zbrueva (December 1867 or January 1868 – 20 October 1936), in Russian Евге́ния Ива́новна Збру́ева, was a Russian contralto opera singer.

Early life 
Zbrueva was born in Moscow, the daughter of composer Pyotr Bulakhov. (Her surname came from her mother's first husband, because her parents were not legally married.) She trained as a singer at the Moscow Conservatory, under E. A. Lavrovskaya.

Career 
Zbrueva was a contralto in the Moscow Imperial Opera at the Bolshoi Theatre from 1894, and with the Mariinsky Theatre from 1905 until 1918, including appearances in Paris and Munich. In 1915 she was appointed Professor of Singing at Petrograd Conservatory. She was named an Honored Artist of the USSR in 1922.

Zbrueva's repertoire included roles in Glinka's A Life for the Tsar (1894), Saint-Saëns' Henry VIII,  Rimsky-Korsakov's The Legend of the Invisible City of Kitezh and the Maiden Fevroniya (1907) and The Snow Maiden (1894), Tchaikovsky's Cherevichki, Mussorgsky's Khovanshchina, Ruslan and Lyudmila, Prince Igor, and Carmen.

Personal life 
Zbrueva died in Moscow in 1936, aged 67 years. Archival recordings of Zbrueva have been included on several anthology recordings, including Singers of imperial Russia. Volume III (1992, Pearl Records), Great singers at the Mariinsky Theatre (1994, Nimbus Records), Great Singers in Moscow (1996, Nimbus Records), and Rimsky-Korsakov performed by his contemporaries (1999, Russian Disc).

References

External links 

 Portrait of Yevgenia Zbrueva as Ratmir in M. I. Glinka’s opera “Ruslan and Ludmila” (1897), at Google Arts and Culture
Zbrueva singing Vanya's aria from A Life for the Tsar, recorded in 1913, on YouTube

1868 births
1936 deaths
Russian opera singers
Mariinsky Theatre
People's Artists of Russia
Moscow Conservatory alumni
Residents of the Benois House